Cebu City is politically subdivided into 80 barangays.

The city is divided into two legislative districts, with 46 barangays to the north (1st District) and 34 barangays to the south (2nd District), for the purposes of electing members to the House of Representatives of the Philippines and the Sangguniang Panlungsod.

As of the 2020 census, 58 barangays are classified as urban barangays where 888,481 (92.15%) of Cebu City's population lives, while the remaining 22 rural barangays are home to 75,668 residents, representing 7.85% of the total population.

The most populous barangays in the city, as of the 2020 census, are Guadalupe (70,039), Tisa (47,364), and Lahug (45,853), while Kalubihan is the least populous barangay with only 663 residents.

List of barangays

Liga ng mga Barangay-Cebu City Chapter
The Liga ng mga Barangay-Cebu City Chapter is a formal organization of all the barangays in Cebu City with its mother organization which is the Liga ng mga Barangay sa Pilipinas. All of the city's 80 barangays are part of the said organization. The President of the LNB-Cebu City Chapter is an ex-officio member of the Sangguniang Panglungsod.

Here are the current officers of LNB-Cebu City Chapter:

Changes and disputes

Barangay Duljo Fatima
Ricardo "Joel" Ycong defeated incumbent councilor Juliet Abella, wife of the outgoing barangay captain Elmer Abella who was running for barangay councilor, for the post of barangay captain of Duljo Fatima in the 2018 barangay elections. Three days after his proclamation, Ycong succumbed to heart attack.

Following the rule of succession, the first-ranked councilor who happened to be outgoing barangay captain and newly-elected barangay councilor Abella became the new barangay captain.

Barangay Ermita
On July 19, 2018, barangay captain Mark Rizaldy Miral of Ermita together with his six barangay councilors namely Antonieto Flores, Ryan Jay Rosas, Alio Tamundo, Domingo Ando, Maria Buanghug, and Wilbert Flores were suspended for one year by the Office of the Ombudsman. The said officials were held liable for grave neglect of duty for refusing to assist the Philippine Drug Enforcement Agency in their operation on November 6, 2016.

As a result, barangay councilor Efe Rupinta took over as acting barangay captain until Miral and the rest of the barangay councilors were reinstated on July 22, 2019.

Barangay Mabolo
As first-ranked barangay councilor, Frank Gajudo assumed the position of barangay captain of Mabolo on noon of June 30, 2019, after the office holder Prisca Niña Mabatid ran and won as Cebu City councilor in the 2019 elections.

Barangay Mambaling
Barangay captain Gines Abellana was suspended by the Cebu City Council on January 9, 2019, for not releasing the honorarium of four barangay councilors since July to December 2018. The first-ranked councilor Anne Marie Palomo assumed the position as acting barangay captain on January 10, 2019, after taking oath to then Mayor Tomas Osmeña but Abellana refused to step down pending an opinion from the Department of the Interior and Local Government (DILG). On September 30, 2019, Cebu City Legal Officer Rey Gealon informed members of the Cebu City Council that Abellana can reassume his post after getting a favorable opinion from DILG.

Barangay Poblacion Pardo
On June 7, 2020, barangay captain Manolita Abarquez died due to complications from pneumonia. She was succeeded by the first-ranked barangay councilor Archie Araw–Araw.

Barangay San Roque
As first-ranked barangay councilor, Virginia Abenoja assumed the position of barangay captain of San Roque after the office holder Rogelio Ruizo died on November 7, 2019.

Barangay Tisa
As first-ranked barangay councilor, Renato "Ringo" Pacaña assumed the position of barangay captain of Tisa on noon of June 30, 2019, after the office holder Phillip Zafra ran and won as Cebu City councilor in the 2019 elections.

Barangay Zapatera
Francisco Benedicto, barangay captain of Zapatera, was suspended for 2 months by the Cebu City Council on December 18, 2019, in view of the sexual harassment and graft and corruption complaints filed against him. Juan Flores, the first-ranked barangay councilor, temporarily assumed his position.

Formally proposed/renamed barangays

Proposed barangay with enacted law

Rejected in a plebiscite
 Banawa-Englis (2010)The act dividing Barangay Guadalupe into two, Republic Act No. 9905, was approved on January 7, 2010. Banawa-Englilsh was to be composed of the puroks in Sitio Banawa and Sitio English. The COMELEC originally scheduled the plebiscite on March 13, 2010, but was delayed because of court petition from then Labangon barangay councilman Victor Buendia to withhold the plebiscite. A new date of the plebiscite was set and on July 28, 2012, majority of the votes cast rejected the division.

Proposed rename barangay
 Buot-Taup to Pedro Calungsod (2000-2011)Then barangay captain Rosalina Callino lobbied to the Cebu City Council the renaming of Barangay Buot-Taup to Pedro Calungsod, who was beatified March 5, 2000, after their barangay council adopted a resolution changing the barangay's name due to the negative connotation of the word "taup" which means "deeply rooted" in Cebuano.
 Buot-Taup to Buot (2011)The barangay, in a new resolution, proposed to drop the word "taup" from Barangay Buot-Taup. The Cebu City Council referred it to the Culture and Historical Affairs Commission (CHAC) for their comments and recommendations.

References

Cebu City
Cebu City